Jacques-Bernard-Marie Montané (5 January 1751, Toulouse–after 1805) was president of the Revolutionary Tribunal from March to August in 1793, during the French Revolution.

He was president at the trial of Charlotte Corday.

He was seen as insufficiently radical, and was replaced by Martial Herman.

He survived the Thermidorian Reaction.

Sources
Landeux, Philippe Le tribunal révolutionnaire de Paris (1793-1795) (2017)

Presidents of the French Revolutionary Tribunal
Politicians from Toulouse
1751 births
19th-century deaths
Year of death unknown